The following is an alphabetical list of topics related to the Republic of Guatemala.

0–9

 .gt – Internet country code top-level domain for Guatemala

A
 ADIVIMA
 Adjacent countries:

 Air Force of Guatemala
 Airports in Guatemala
 Ak'tenamit
 Americas
North America
 Central America
 Islands of Guatemala
 North Atlantic Ocean
 Mar Caribe (Caribbean Sea)
 North Pacific Ocean
 Army of Guatemala
 Atlas of Guatemala
 La Aurora International Airport

B
 Bank of Guatemala (central bank)
 Birds of Guatemala
 Buddhism in Guatemala

C
 Capital of Guatemala:  La Nueva Guatemala de la Asunción (Guatemala City)
 Categories:
 :Category:Guatemala
 :Category:Buildings and structures in Guatemala
 :Category:Communications in Guatemala
 :Category:Economy of Guatemala
 :Category:Education in Guatemala
 :Category:Environment of Guatemala
 :Category:Geography of Guatemala
 :Category:Government of Guatemala
 :Category:Guatemala stubs
 :Category:Guatemalan culture
 :Category:Guatemalan people
 :Category:Guatemala-related lists
 :Category:Health in Guatemala
 :Category:History of Guatemala
 :Category:Law of Guatemala
 :Category:Military of Guatemala
 
 :Category:Politics of Guatemala
 :Category:Science and technology in Guatemala
 :Category:Society of Guatemala
 :Category:Sport in Guatemala
 :Category:Transportation in Guatemala
 commons:Category:Guatemala
 CENADOJ
 Central America
 Cities of Guatemala
 Climate of Guatemala
 Coat of arms of Guatemala
 Álvaro Colom
 Communications in Guatemala
 Congress of Guatemala
 Constitution of Guatemala
 Cuisine of Guatemala
 Culture of Guatemala

D
 Demographics of Guatemala
 Departments of Guatemala
 Diplomatic missions in Guatemala
 Diplomatic missions of Guatemala

E
 Earthquakes in Guatemala
 Economy of Guatemala
 Education in Guatemala
 Elections in Guatemala

F

 Flag of Guatemala
 Foreign relations of Guatemala

G
 Geography of Guatemala
 Government of Guatemala
 Gross domestic product
 Guate
 Guatemala
 Guatemala at the Olympics
 Guatemala City (La Nueva Guatemala de la Asunción) – Capital of Guatemala
 Guatemala Department
 Guatemalan general election, 1974
 Guatemalan quetzal currency
Guatemala under Mexican rule

H
 "Himno Nacional de Guatemala"
 History of Guatemala
 Holdridge life zones in Guatemala

I
 International Organization for Standardization (ISO)
 ISO 3166-1 alpha-2 country code for Guatemala: GT
 ISO 3166-1 alpha-3 country code for Guatemala: GTM
 ISO 3166-2:GT region codes for Guatemala
 Internet in Guatemala
 Islam in Guatemala
 Islands of Guatemala

K
 Kaibiles

L
 La Nueva Guatemala de la Asunción (Guatemala City) – Capital of Guatemala
 Languages of Guatemala
 Latin America
 Law enforcement in Guatemala
 LGBT rights in Guatemala (Gay rights)
 Lists related to Guatemala:
 Diplomatic missions of Guatemala
 List of airports in Guatemala
 List of birds of Guatemala
 List of cities in Guatemala
 List of countries by GDP (nominal)
 List of diplomatic missions in Guatemala
 List of islands of Guatemala
 List of Guatemalans
 List of Guatemala-related topics
 List of mountains of Guatemala
 List of national parks of Guatemala
 List of political parties in Guatemala
 List of rivers of Guatemala
 List of volcanoes in Guatemala
 List of World Heritage Sites in Guatemala
 Topic outline of Guatemala
Lotería Santa Lucía

M
 Mar Caribe
 Maximón
 Military of Guatemala
 Ministry of Defence (Guatemala)
 Mountains of Guatemala
 Mundo Maya International Airport
 Municipalities of Guatemala
 Óscar Murúa
 Music of Guatemala

N
 Ngo involvement in Guatemala
 National anthem of Guatemala
 National parks of Guatemala
 North America
 Northern Hemisphere

P
 Political parties in Guatemala
 Politics of Guatemala
 Postal codes in Guatemala
 President of Guatemala
 Prominent Guatemalans
 Prostitution in Guatemala

Q
 Quetzal

R
 Rail transport in Guatemala
 Religion in Guatemala
 Resplendent quetzal (national symbol of Guatemala)
 Republic of Guatemala (República de Guatemala)
 Rivers of Guatemala

S
 Secret Anti-Communist Army
 Socialist Workers Unification
 Spanish colonization of the Americas
 Spanish conquest of the Maya
 Spanish language

T
 Topic outline of Guatemala
 Transport in Guatemala
 Trees of Guatemala

U
 United Nations founding member state 1945
 United States-Guatemala relations
 Universidad Francisco Marroquín
 Universities in Guatemala

V
 Volcán Tajumulco – highest point in Guatemala and all of Central America
 Volcanoes in Guatemala

W
 Water supply and sanitation in Guatemala
 Western Hemisphere
 
 Wikipedia:WikiProject Topic outline/Drafts/Topic outline of Guatemala
 World Heritage Sites in Guatemala
 Worry doll

See also

 
 
 List of Central America-related topics
 List of international rankings
 Lists of country-related topics
 Topic outline of geography
 Topic outline of Guatemala
 Topic outline of North America
 United Nations

References

External links
 

 
Guatemala